Kunur River, one of the main tributaries of the Ajay,  in length, has its origin near Bansgara in the Faridpur police station area. With water from several small streams swelling it during the monsoons, it often floods large areas of the Ausgram community blocks and Mangalkot police stations of Bardhaman district. It joins the Ajay near Ujani village.

Archaeology
Microliths of crystalline stone and petrified wood from about 1250–1000 BC are found in many places in the Ajay-Kunur-Kopai river system.

References

Rivers of West Bengal
Rivers of India